José Borrello may refer to:

José Borello (1929–2013), Argentine footballer
Carlos Borrello (born 1955), Argentine football manager